Maharaja Raol Sir Takhtsinhji Jaswantsinhji  KIH  (6 January 185829 January 1896), was Maharaja of Bhavnagar, a Rajput chief of the Gohil clan, and ruler of Bhavnagar state in Kathiawar. He succeeded to the throne of Bhavnagar upon the death of his father, Jaswantsinhji, in 1870.

Life

Takhtsinhji attended the Delhi Durbar in 1877 and was granted a personal gun salute of 15 guns. During his minority studies, which ended on 5 April 1878, he was educated at the Rajkumar College, Rajkot being the first student. Afterward, he studied under an English officer, while the administration of the state was conducted jointly by Mr. E. H. Percival, a member of the Indian Civil Service, and Gaurishankar Udayshankar, C.S.I., one of the foremost native statesmen of India, who had served the state in various capacities since 1822.

His first public act was to sanction a railway connecting his territory with one of the main trunk lines, which was the first enterprise of its kind on the part of a raja in western (if not all) India. The amount of commerce, trade, economic and social development of the state that came in the wake of this railway confirmed Takhtsinhji as supporting a policy of progressive administration. Further educational establishments, hospitals, dispensaries, trunk roads, bridges, handsome edifices, and other public works projects followed.

Takhtsinhji was awarded the Empress of India Gold Medal in 1877, and knighted as a KCSI in 1881. In 1886, he inaugurated a system of constitutional rule, by placing several departments in the hands of four members of a council of state under his own presidency. This innovation—which had the support of the governor of Bombay, Lord Reay—provoked a virulent attack upon the chief, who brought his defamers to trial at the High Court of Bombay. The punishment of the ringleaders broke up a blackmailing system to which rajas were regularly exposed. The public spirit toward Takhtsinhji in freeing his brother chiefs from blackmail was widely acknowledged throughout India, as well as by the British authorities.

In 1886, he was promoted to GCSI, and five years later his hereditary title of Thakur was raised to that of Maharaja. In 1893 he took advantage of the opening of the Imperial Institute to visit England in order to pay personal homage to Queen Victoria, then sovereign of the British Empire. During that occasion, the University of Cambridge awarded him the degree of LL.D.

As the first pupil of Rajkumar College, Rajkot, Takhtsinhji became its greatest patron and benefactor following his accession to the throne of Bhavnagar. He was also a great benefactor to Gujarat College, Fergusson College, and the Wadhwan Girassia School, as well as several girls' and women's schools. He founded Samaldas Arts College in 1885, which he named after the later Diwan of State, Samaldas Mehta. During his reign, he undertook intensive developments, reformed the revenue department, erected water works and modern docks, extended medical relief, built a port, bridges, hospitals, and schools and worked to and modernize Bhavnagar. Celebrated as a "model ruler of a model state" during his own lifetime, the Maharaja died at the Moti Bagh Palace on 29 January 1896 at the age of 38. He was succeeded as Maharaja of Bhavnagar by his eldest son, Bhavsinhji II.

Titles
Over his life, Takhtsinhji was known by the following titles:
1858–1870: Maharajkumar Shri Takhtsinhji Jaswantsinhji Sahib Gohil, Yuvraj Sahib of Bhavnagar
1870–1877: His Highness Maharaj Raol Shri Takhtsinhji Jaswantsinhji Sahib, Maharaj Raol Thakore Sahib of Bhavnagar
1877–1881: His Highness Maharaj Raol Shri Takhtsinhji Jaswantsinhji Sahib, Maharaj Raol Thakore Sahib of Bhavnagar, KIH
1881–1886: His Highness Maharaj Raol Shri Sir Takhtsinhji Jaswantsinhji Sahib, Maharaj Raol Thakore Sahib of Bhavnagar, KCSI, KIH
1886–1891: His Highness Maharaj Raol Shri Sir Takhtsinhji Jaswantsinhji Sahib, Maharaj Raol Thakore Sahib of Bhavnagar, GCSI, KIH

Honors
During his lifetime, Takhtsinhji received the following honors:
Prince of Wales gold medal: 1875
Empress of India Gold Medal: 1877
Knight Grand Commander of the Order of the Star of India (GCSI): 1886  (KCSI: 1881)
Personal title of Maharaja: 1891

References

1858 births
1896 deaths
Knights Grand Commander of the Order of the Star of India
Maharajas of Bhavnagar
Gujarati people
Rajput rulers
Bhavnagar district
Founders of Indian schools and colleges
Indian knights
19th-century Indian philanthropists